Rajesh K. Gupta (born 1961) is a computer scientist and engineer, currently the Qualcomm Professor in Embedded Microsystems at University of California, San Diego. His research concerns design and optimization of cyber-physical systems (CPS). He is a Principal Investigator in the NSF MetroInsight project and serves as Associate Director of the Qualcomm Institute (also known as California Institute for Telecommunications and Information Technology). His research contributions include SystemC and SPARK Parallelizing High-level Synthesis. Earlier he led NSF Expeditions on Variability in Microelectronic circuits.

He was the inaugural co-director of the UC San Diego Halıcıoğlu Data Science Institute along with Cognitive Science professor Jeffrey Elman. In addition, he chaired the Computer Science and Engineering department at UC San Diego until 2016, during a time of extraordinary growth in computer science nationwide.

He holds INRIA International Chair at the French international research institute in Rennes, Bretagne Atlantique. He is a Fellow of the IEEE, a Fellow of the Association for Computing Machinery and a Fellow of the American Association for the Advancement of Science. In 2019 he received the IEEE W. Wallace McDowell Award for his "seminal contributions in design and implementation of Microelectronic Systems-on-Chip and Cyberphysical Systems." He also served on the Engineering and Computer Science jury for the Infosys Prize, from 2014 to 2018.

Education
Gupta received a BTech (1984) in Electrical Engineering from IIT Kanpur, an MS (1986) in EECS from UC Berkeley, and a PhD (1994) in Electrical Engineering from Stanford.

References

Books 
 SPARK: A Parallelizing Approach to the High-Level Synthesis of Digital Circuits, by Sumit Gupta, Rajesh K. Gupta, Nikil Dutt, Alex Nicolau, Kluwer Academic Publishers, 2004
 High-Level Verification, Methods and Tools for Verification of System-Level Designs, by Sudipta Kundu, Sorin Lerner, Rajesh K. Gupta
 Co-Synthesis of Hardware and Software for Digital Embedded Systems, by Rajesh Kumar Gupta
 Formal Methods and Models for System Design by Rajesh Gupta, Paul Le Guernic, Sandeep Kumar Shukla, Jean-Pierre Talpin
 From Variability Tolerance to Approximate Computing in Parallel Integrated Architectures and Accelerators by Abbas Rahimi, Luca Benini, Rajesh K. Gupta

External links

 Gupta's webpage
 Revolutionizing how we keep track of time in cyber-physical systems
 San Diego Struggles to Keep Its Young Tech Talent
 Analysts fear even bigger cyber attacks are coming
 Do people want to talk to Bots?
 PCs that work while they sleep
 Moneta system points to the future of computer storage
 Want to date your smartphone?
 Gift to transform UCSD Computer Science
 How much life is left in Moore's Law?
 Interview: Future of CPS, History and Passage of Time
 Origins Podcast

Computer scientists
21st-century American engineers
Science writers
Living people
University of California, Davis faculty
Fellows of the Association for Computing Machinery
1961 births